The Royal Landmark Tower is a residential skyscraper located in Xitun District, Taichung, Taiwan. It was completed in 2010. It is one of the tallest residential buildings in Taichung.

See also 
 List of tallest buildings in Taiwan
 List of tallest buildings in Taichung
 Taichung's 7th Redevelopment Zone

References

2010 establishments in Taiwan
Residential skyscrapers in Taiwan
Skyscrapers in Taichung
Taichung's 7th Redevelopment Zone
Apartment buildings in Taiwan
Residential buildings completed in 2010